Hasan Tabib (also Romanized as Ḩasan Ţabīb; also known as Ḩasan Ţeyyeb) is a village in Katul Rural District, in the Central District of Aliabad County, Golestan Province, Iran. At the 2006 census, its population was 1,182, in 222 families.

References 

Populated places in Aliabad County